Terminus Repentigny is a bus terminus served by Réseau de transport métropolitain (RTM).

Bus routes

See also 
 ARTM park and ride lots

References

External links
 Terminus Metropolitains - Repentigny

Exo bus stations
Transport in Repentigny, Quebec
Buildings and structures in Lanaudière